The File on Thelma Jordon is a 1950 American film noir drama film directed by Robert Siodmak and starring Barbara Stanwyck and Wendell Corey. The screenplay by Ketti Frings, based on an unpublished short story by Marty Holland, concerns a woman who pretends to fall in love with an assistant district attorney and uses him to escape conviction for the murder of her wealthy aunt.

Plot
Thelma Jordon shows up late one night in the office of the district attorney to report a series of attempted burglaries at her Aunt Vera's home. The district attorney, Miles Scott, is out, but she meets the assistant district attorney, Cleve Marshall, an unhappily married man who would rather get drunk than go home. Cleve asks her to join him for a drink and she agrees. Before he can stop himself, he is caught up in a love affair with the mysterious, seductive Thelma.

Thelma, who claims to be estranged from her husband Tony, lives with the wealthy, reclusive Vera. One night Vera hears noises in the house, picks up a gun, and is shot dead. Thelma calls Cleve, telling him that an intruder killed Vera. He helps cover up evidence that might incriminate her. When the district attorney arrests Thelma as the prime suspect, Cleve goes to work undermining the case from the inside. He takes over the prosecution and handles it so badly that the defense is able to convince the jury of reasonable doubt. Footprints belonging to an elusive "Mr X"—in fact, Cleve himself, as he engaged in the cover-up—further weaken the case. Thelma is acquitted and inherits Vera's money. More of her past is then revealed: she did kill Vera, and Tony, who is not her husband but her lover, had dreamed up the scheme so that both could get rich.

When Cleve comes to the house, already aware that Thelma has been lying, she acknowledges the relationship with Tony. Tony hits Cleve over the head, knocking him out so the two can escape. Unable to deal with her guilty conscience, Thelma causes a car accident that results in her accomplice's death and her own fatal injury. As she lies dying, she confesses the truth to the district attorney. However, she does not incriminate Cleve as Mr. X, saying she cannot reveal the man's name because she loves him. The district attorney figures it on his own and tells Cleve that he will be disbarred for his actions. Cleve replies that he had already been in the act of confessing to his complicity when he heard about the car accident. He walks away to a different life.

Cast
 Barbara Stanwyck as Thelma Jordon
 Wendell Corey as Cleve Marshall
 Paul Kelly as Miles Scott
 Joan Tetzel as Pamela Marshall
 Stanley Ridges as Kingsley Willis
 Richard Rober as Tony Laredo
 Gertrude W. Hoffmann as Aunt Vera Edwards
 Basil Ruysdael as judge Jonathan David Hancock
 Kenneth Tobey as Police Photographer (uncredited)

Wendell Corey's real-life children Robin and Jonathan played non-speaking roles as the daughter and son of his character in the film.

Production
The project was filmed and marketed under the title Thelma Jordon. It was the ninth film noir to be made by director Robert Siodmak. Principal photography took place between February 14 and March 29, 1949. Location filming was held at the Old Orange County Courthouse in Santa Ana, California, and at the Los Angeles County jail.

Release
Though the film carries a copyright date of August 1, 1949, it had its premiere in New York on January 18, 1950. It grossed $51.5 million in adjusted domestic box office receipts.

Critical reception
Variety praised the film, writing: "Thelma Jordon unfolds as an interesting, femme-slanted melodrama, told with a lot of restrained excitement. Scripting from a story by Marty Holland is very forthright, up to the contrived conclusion, and even that is carried off successfully because of the sympathy developed for the misguided and misused character played by Wendell Corey".

Time Out gave the film 5 out of 5 stars, comparing it favorably to the classic film noir Double Indemnity in which Stanwyck also stars. It singles out Corey's performance as "the nondescript assistant DA she drives to the brink of destruction. The part is played (remarkably well) by Corey, whose haunted, hangdog persona as a perennial loser is echoed so perfectly by the deliberately slow, inexorable tempo of Siodmak's direction (not to mention George Barnes' superbly bleak lighting)". Radio Times also lauds the direction and Corey's performance as "a hapless assistant DA, played to meek perfection by Wendell Corey", and writes about Stanwyck: "In these thrillers Stanwyck has a terrific, deadly allure and the moody lighting and the music conspire with her, keeping the men fluttering around her like moths to a flame".

The New York Times gave a mixed review, stating: "Thelma Jordon is, for all of its production polish, adult dialogue, and intelligent acting, a strangely halting and sometimes confusing work". The review criticized the slow pace of the film and the not-unexpected climax, but gave credit to Stanwyck for "handling a complex assignment professionally and with a minimum of forced histrionics".

Adaptations
The script was adapted for a 1950 radio drama on Screen Directors Playhouse.

References

Sources

External links

Streaming audio
 The File on Thelma Jordon on Screen Directors Playhouse: March 15, 1951

1950 films
1950 drama films
American drama films
American black-and-white films
1950s English-language films
Film noir
Films scored by Victor Young
Films directed by Robert Siodmak
Films produced by Hal B. Wallis
Paramount Pictures films
Films with screenplays by Ketti Frings
1950s American films